The Mitsubishi B5M was an Imperial Japanese Navy Air Service (IJNAS) land-based attack aircraft, originally intended for carrier use. The B5M was also given the long formal designation  and Allied reporting name of Mabel. 

The B5M was designed in response to a 1935 specification for a new bomber for use on the IJNAS aircraft carriers (Mitsubishi Navy Experimental 10-Shi Carrier Torpedo Attacker). The machine was to have a crew of three, folding wings for flight deck storage, a speed of not less than 322 km/h (200 mph), a flight endurance of not less than seven hours, and the ability to carry at least 800 kg (1,760 lb) of bombs - a tall order for a single-engine aircraft of the mid-1930s. It was intended as a backup for the Nakajima B5N "Kate" torpedo bomber. Although designed as a carrier-based aircraft, it was relegated to land-based torpedo bomber duties in World War II. 125 were built.

Operational history
The aircraft that Mitsubishi produced first flew in 1937 and was an all-metal, low-wing cantilever monoplane with fixed undercarriage with large wheel spats. The crew of three sat in a long canopy that had a smooth transition to the fuselage. The B5M1s began equipping Japanese Naval units in late 1937, but their performance was never as satisfactory as was that of other Japanese aircraft carrier-based bombers. The B5M1's performance was considered marginal and only 125 were manufactured. While they had originally been intended for aircraft carrier use, the majority were employed during the early months of World War II from land bases in Southeast Asia and in China, where they were confronted by weak or no enemy fighter opposition. These machines ended their careers as trainers, target tugs, and kamikazes.

Variants
B5M1:Three-seat attack aircraft for the Imperial Japanese Navy.

Operators

Imperial Japanese Navy

Specifications (Mitsubishi B5M1)

See also

References

Bibliography

Francillon, René J. Japanese Aircraft of the Pacific War. London: Putnam, 1970. .
Francillon, René J. Japanese Aircraft of the Pacific War. London: Putnam & Company Ltd., 1979. .

Carrier-based aircraft
B5M
B5M, Mitsubishi
Single-engined tractor aircraft
Low-wing aircraft
B5M, Mitsubishi
Aircraft first flown in 1937